Herald of the Morning was a three-masted square-rigged sailing ship, built in 1853 or 1854 at Saint John, New Brunswick, Canada, expressly for the Australia run. The contemporary Melbourne press described her as 'a fine ship of 1292 tons register'

Wright claims she was built in 1853, but not registered until 1854. Some sources cite 1855 Port number 27, The ship was also owned by George King and John Storm. James Thompson

Voyages
Liverpool to Melbourne 19 December 1854, Cpt. John Attridge

Liverpool to Melbourne 1857

Liverpool to Sydney New South Wales, 25 June 1858, Cpt. G Rudolph, Master, Burthen 1291 tons

Melbourne to Callao, 9 August 1858

Liverpool to Melbourne 5 November 1859

Fire and wreck

At the end of her second voyage to Australia in 1859 with 419 government immigrants, Herald of the Morning was anchored in Hobson's Bay, when at about 12:45 pm on 15 November the captain awoke to someone yelling out FIRE! The fire quickly spread through the entire vessel. Despite attempts to scuttle the ship by cutting holes in her side near the waterline, as she burnt and became lighter so that the scuttling holes rose above the water level. An attempt was made to move the ship, by slipping the anchor chains, but the heat drove the crew back from the other. Finally it was cut through from the outside and towed ashore at Sandridge (Port Melbourne) by two tugs, Lioness and Sophia, and left to burn.

The tugs Sophia and Hercules later towed the ship to the beach between Sandridge and Williamstown where she continued to smolder (UID 152). The hulk was eventually removed and sunk at the end of Donaldsons jetty in about 1889.

Included in the cargo was iron work intended for the Hawthorn Bridge, and while this was recovered, the fire had damaged it. It was subsequently salvaged and partly sold at auction eventually to become the trusses for the Mia Mia Bridge at Redesdale. The wreck was advertised for sale on 29 November 1859.

The hulk appears to have remained sitting on the beach for many years until the Melbourne Harbour Trust Commissioners adopted the following recommendations of its Finance Committee:

Your Committee recommend that Messrs. H. B. Donaldson and Co. be called upon as provided by Section 76 of the Act to remove their sunken hulk in Hobson's Bay at Sandridge within a reasonable time (to be named in the notice), and should they fail to remove the said hulk within such time, that she be removed by the Trust as provided by the said Section. Your Committee further recommend that the firm named and Messrs. Stewart, White and Co. be called upon to attorn tenants to the trust under conditions to be submitted by this Committee to the Commissioners and approved by them.

References

External links
 http://home.vicnet.net.au/~maav/herald.htm
 http://www.wrecksite.eu/wreck.aspx?57084

Individual sailing vessels
Ships built in New Brunswick
Merchant ships of Canada
Victorian-era merchant ships of the United Kingdom
Maritime incidents in November 1859
1853 ships
Sailing ships of Canada
Ship fires
Shipwrecks of Victoria (Australia)
Maritime incidents in 1889